{{DISPLAYTITLE:C40H82}}
The molecular formula C40H82 may refer to:

 Lycopane, an alkane isoprenoid
 Tetracontane, an alkane
 15,19,23-trimethylheptatriacontane, an alkane pheromone

Molecular formulas